Ignacio Sola Cortabarria (born 1 February 1944) is a Spanish athlete. He competed in the men's pole vault at the 1964 Summer Olympics and the 1968 Summer Olympics.

References

1944 births
Living people
Athletes (track and field) at the 1964 Summer Olympics
Athletes (track and field) at the 1968 Summer Olympics
Spanish male pole vaulters
Olympic athletes of Spain
Mediterranean Games silver medalists for Spain
Mediterranean Games medalists in athletics
Athletes (track and field) at the 1971 Mediterranean Games
Sportspeople from Bilbao
Athletes from the Basque Country (autonomous community)